Pedro Tyrone Collins (born 12 August 1976) is a cricket coach and former cricketer who played as a fast bowler for the West Indies.

Collins also featured for Barbados, Surrey and Middlesex in his cricketing career.

International career
As a left-handed seam bowler, Collins shot to fame after getting Sachin Tendulkar out three times and twice for a duck during the 2001-02 India vs West Indies Test series.

He later took 6 for 53, on the 7 June 2004, at Sabina Park in the second test of a two match test series against Bangladesh. Collins' feats with the ball helped the Windies to win the test and the series by 1-0 margin.

Collins picked up 5–43 against Australia at Adelaide Oval in an ODI match of the 2005–06 VB Series.

On 12 June 2006, Collins collected his 100th wicket in test match cricket by dismissing Yuvraj Singh for two on the first day in the second test against India. He eventually took 4 for 75 on the first day in the said test played at the Beausejour Stadium of the 2006 four match series.

Collins eventually claimed 106 wickets at 34.13 in his test match career. He was later selected to be part of the Windies 2007 World Twenty20 squad.

Domestic career
Collins signed for Surrey on 10 October 2007 on a two-year Kolpak deal. He eventually left the club in October 2009.

On 30 March 2010 Middlesex announced his signing for the 2010 season.

Coaching career
Collins attained a level 2 coaching certificate from Cricket Australia and a level 3 coaching certificate from Cricket West Indies. He went on to work as an assistant coach with the Vancouver Knights of the Global T20 Canada, Barbados women's national cricket team together with the St Lucia Zouks of the Caribbean Premier League. Collins later assumed the role of a head coach with the Combined Campuses and Colleges team. He currently works as a cricket coach with the Academy of Sport at the University of the West Indies, Cave Hill Campus.

Personal life
He is the half brother of fellow Barbadian pacer Fidel Edwards. Collins is also a fan of footballer Lionel Messi and football team Barcelona C.F.

References

1976 births
Living people
Barbadian cricketers
West Indies One Day International cricketers
West Indies Test cricketers
Middlesex cricketers
Surrey cricketers
Barbados cricketers
Cricketers at the 2003 Cricket World Cup